The 17th Scripps National Spelling Bee was held in Washington, District of Columbia on May 28, 1941. This was the first year that Scripps-Howard (now E.W. Scripps Company) hosted the event.

The winner was 13-year-old Louis Edward Sissman of Detroit, Michigan, correctly spelling the word initials. Phyllis Davis of Ohio placed second, misspelling "chrysanthemum" (which Sissman proceeded to spell correctly), and third went to 13-year-old Homer Lyon, Jr., of Miami, Florida, who fell on "ague".

The first place prize was $500, followed by $300 for second.

As of 2017, Sissman is the only winner of the Bee from Michigan. At the time of his win, it was widely reported that he was the first boy to win since 1927, apparently overlooking that Ward Randall won in 1931, which was still a ten-year gap.

References

External links
 Photograph of 1941 top three, Scripps National Spelling Bee instagram post (December 17, 2015)

Scripps National Spelling Bee competitions
1941 in education
1941 awards
1941 in Washington, D.C.
May 1941 events